Survivor South Africa is a South African reality game show based on the popular international Survivor format.

As in all versions of the show, it features group of strangers who are marooned in an isolated location, where they must provide food, water, fire and shelter for themselves. The contestants will compete in challenges to earn either a reward, or an immunity from elimination. The contestants will be progressively eliminated from the game as they are voted-off by their fellow contestants until only one remains and is given the title "Ultimate Survivor" and be awarded the grand prize of R1 million. The 9th season, titled Return of the Outcasts, concluded on 25 August 2022.

The first five seasons of the show were produced by Endemol and broadcast on M-Net. Since Season 6, the show has been produced by Afrokaans Film & Television.

The first two seasons were hosted by Mark Bayly, and from the third season Nico Panagio took over the hosting duties.

Format

The show follows the same general format as the other editions of Survivor. To begin, the players are split into two or three tribes, are taken to a remote isolated location and are forced to live off the land with meagre supplies for a period of several weeks. Frequent physical and mental challenges are used to pit the tribes against each other for rewards, such as food or luxuries, or for immunity, forcing the other tribe to attend Tribal Council, where they must vote one of their tribemates out of the game by secret ballot.

About halfway through the game, the tribes are merged into a single tribe, and challenges are on an individual basis; winning immunity prevents that player from being voted out. Most players that are voted out during this stage become members of the Tribal Council Jury. When only two or three players remain, the Final Tribal Council is held. The finalists plead their case to the Jury as to why they should win the game. The jurors then have the opportunity to interrogate the finalists before casting their vote for which finalists should be awarded the title of "Ultimate Survivor" and wins the grand prize of R1 Million.

Like other editions of the show, the South Africa edition has introduced numerous adaptations, or twists, on the core rules to prevent players from over-relying on strategies that succeeded in prior seasons or other editions of the show. The titular Island of Secrets and theImmunity Island Exile Players for a predetermined amount of time while offering dilemmas and decisions that may help or hinder their game, and non-playing Captains in Champions, kidnappings, tribe expansions and shuffles. There may also be twists that effect the game format for a particular round (such as the Tied Destinies twist included on Immunity Island) Voting advantages and disadvantages, and in the first season, Panama included Deadman's Island where contestants voted out after the merge was isolated from the game until an opportunity to return arose.

Seasons

Production

Locations

International broadcast
The series airs on the following channels outside of Africa.

 In Australia, seasons 6 & 7 were made available to stream on 10 Play in September 2020. Seasons 8 & 9 were available to stream on 10 Play on the day after each episode had aired on M-Net.
 In the United Kingdom, seasons 6, 7, and 8 are available on Amazon Prime Video.
In the United States, the sixth, seventh and eighth seasons aired on Paramount+ but are not currently available as of 14 February 2022 due to the service losing streaming rights.

See also

Survivor US
Australian Survivor
Survivor UK
Survivor NZ

References

External links
 Survivor South Africa official website

South Africa
South African reality television series
2006 South African television series debuts
M-Net original programming